Gumbah is a populated place in the northeastern Bari region of Somalia. It is part of the Gumbax District.8.
Estimated Population is 65,000-exclusively residents.
Economic sources of host community. The major source of income are the fishing and frankincense, livestock farming and also small businesses.

Mayor :Mohamud Ahmed Musse (Walow).

Location
Gumbah is located on the northeastern coast of Somalia, facing the Guardafui Channel. It lies 57 nautical miles (66 miles) south of Cape Guardafui and the entrance to the Gulf of Aden. The cape of Ras Binnah is situated 16 nm (18 miles) to the north, while the town Hafun is 30 nm (35 miles) to the south.

Administration
In April 2013, the Puntland government announced the creation of a new region coextensive with Gumbah and Cape Guardafui, named Gardafuul. Carved out of the Bari region, it consists of three districts and has its capital at Alula.

See also
Maritime history of Somalia
Geography of Somalia

References
Gumbah, Somalia

Bari, Somalia
Geography of Somalia